The Tacuarembó River is a river in Uruguay. The Tacuarembó and the Yí Rivers are the principal tributaries of the Río Negro.

Among the tributaries of the Tacuarembó River are included the Caraguatá River.

See also
List of rivers of Uruguay

References
Rand McNally, The New International Atlas, 1993.
 GEOnet Names Server

Rivers of Uruguay